El Idwa is a city in the Minya Governorate of Egypt. It is located on the west bank of the Nile.

See also
 List of cities and towns in Egypt

Idwa